William Wendell Cramer (May 22, 1891 – September 11, 1966) was a pitcher in Major League Baseball. He played for the Cincinnati Reds in 1912.

References

External links

1891 births
1966 deaths
Major League Baseball pitchers
Cincinnati Reds players
Baseball players from Indiana
People from Bedford, Indiana
Shelbyville Rivermen players
Maysville Rivermen players
Frankfort Statesmen players
Frankfort Lawmakers players
Huntington Blue Sox players
Fort Wayne Railroaders players
Terre Haute Highlanders players